Tokū is an uninhabited, volcanic island in Tonga. It is located in the very north of Vavaʻu group in the north of the country.

The closest island is Fonualei 19.7 km to the northwest.

The island was inhabited in the 1830's, the inhabitants living on Tokū and having gardens on Fonualei. Following the 1846 eruption of Fonualei they relocated to 'Utulei in Vavaʻu.

See also

 Desert island
 List of islands

References

Uninhabited islands of Tonga
Vavaʻu